Yttrocerite is a variety of the mineral fluorite with a chemical formula CaF2+(Y,Ce)F3. It is bluish red with isometric crystals and is named for the yttrium and cerium it contains. It has a Mohs hardness of 4–5.  It has been found in Sweden, several states in the United States and Norway. It is not a mineral species approved by International Mineralogical Association.

References 

 Marie-Nicolas Bouillet, Dictionnaire universel des sciences, des lettres et des arts, 1896.

Calcium minerals
Yttrium minerals
Fluorine minerals
Lanthanide minerals